Kakareza-ye Amid Ali (also Romanized as Kākāreẕā-ye Āmīd ʿAlī; also known as Kākāreẕā-ye Markazī and Shahrak-e Kākā Reẕā) is a village in Honam Rural District, in the Central District of Selseleh County, Lorestan Province, Iran. At the 2006 census, its population was 86, in 15 families.

References 

Towns and villages in Selseleh County